Richard John Samworth  (born May 1978) is the Professor of Statistical Science and the Director of the Statistical Laboratory, University of Cambridge, and a Teaching Fellow of St John's College, Cambridge. He was educated at St John's College, Cambridge. His main research interests are in nonparametric and high-dimensional statistics. Particular topics include shape-constrained density estimation and other nonparametric function estimation problems, nonparametric classification, clustering and regression, the bootstrap and high-dimensional variable selection problems.

Honours and awards
 Rustagi Memorial Lecture (2021), The Ohio State University
 Fellow, Royal Society (2021 election)
 The COPSS Presidents' Award 2018
 IMS Medallion Lecture 2018 
 The Adams Prize 2017
 Fellow, American Statistical Association (2015 election)
 Philip Leverhulme Prize 2014, Leverhulme Trust
 Fellow, Institute of Mathematical Statistics (2014 election)
The Guy Medal in Bronze 2012, Royal Statistical Society
The Research Prize 2008, Royal Statistical Society

Selected works 
 
 
 Fan, J., Samworth, R. and Wu, Y. (2009), Ultrahigh dimensional feature selection: beyond the linear model, Journal of Machine Learning Research, 10, 2013–2038.

References

External links 
 Richard Samworth's home page at the University of Cambridge.

Alumni of St John's College, Cambridge
English statisticians
Fellows of St John's College, Cambridge
Cambridge mathematicians
Fellows of the American Statistical Association
Fellows of the Institute of Mathematical Statistics
Living people
1978 births
Professors of the University of Cambridge
Annals of Statistics editors
Mathematical statisticians